IICC Centre-Dwarka Sector 25 is an upcoming metro station extension for Delhi Metro Orange Line servicing the upcoming India International Convention and Expo Centre (IICC). It is an underground station located within the IICC perimeters. Trials on this line started on 26 June 2022. It is scheduled to open for services later in 2023.

References 



Delhi Metro stations